Hardy Cove is the 950 m wide cove indenting for 1.37 km the east coast of Greenwich Island in the South Shetland Islands, Antarctica and surmounted by Parchevich Ridge to the north and Ilarion Ridge to the south.  The cove was known to the early 19th century sealers.

The cove is named after Admiral Sir Thomas Hardy, (1769–1839), Flag Captain in HMS Victory at the Battle of Trafalgar and First Sea Lord in 1830-34; the name was originally applied by Captain Robert Fildes to nearby Sartorius Point.

Location

Maps
 L.L. Ivanov et al. Antarctica: Livingston Island and Greenwich Island, South Shetland Islands. Scale 1:100000 topographic map. Sofia: Antarctic Place-names Commission of Bulgaria, 2005.
 L.L. Ivanov. Antarctica: Livingston Island and Greenwich, Robert, Snow and Smith Islands. Scale 1:120000 topographic map.  Troyan: Manfred Wörner Foundation, 2009.

References
 SCAR Composite Antarctic Gazetteer.

Coves of Greenwich Island